A Crystal Globe is a trophy given to the winners of various international competitions:

In media 
 Crystal Globe (Karlovy Vary International Film Festival), for films
 Globe de Cristal Awards, for art and culture

In sport
Given to the season standings leaders of:
 FIS Alpine Ski World Cup, overall and by discipline
 FIS Freestyle Ski World Cup, overall and by discipline
 Biathlon World Cup, overall and by discipline
 Bobsleigh World Cup, by discipline
 Skeleton World Cup, by discipline

See also 
 Crystal ball (disambiguation)
 Crystal World (disambiguation)